This is a character guide to the manga and anime series Mobile Police Patlabor.

Characters

Section 2 Division 2

English voice actors: Michael Schwartz (Central Park Media, TV/OVA), Peter Marinker (Manga, Movies 1-2), Roger C. Smith (Bandai Visual, Movies 1-2), Daran Norris (Geneon, Movie 3)
 Section 2 Division 2: Captain of Division 2. Was born in the Taito Ward in Tokyo. He seems quite laid back, even apathetic, but is in fact an extremely capable and politically savvy police officer; not only is his strategic awareness quite acute, Goto is as subtle and manipulative as any given situation requires. Hence he got the nickname "Razor Goto" in the police. It was rumored that because of these traits, the top officials in the police force assigned him to SV2 for fear he might ruffle too many feathers. True to form, however, Goto is on top of most events long before most others are even aware of what is going on. It can also be noted that within him a small sadistic streak exists, in that he enjoys the suffering of his team members in letting them do all the detective work when he already knew what they are sent out to discover; much to the chagrin of his subordinates who loathe this quality. Goto is a heavy smoker, has athlete's foot and can often be seen wearing traditional Japanese wooden sandals around the office. It is very strongly implied that Kiichi has a crush on Shinobu, which seems completely unrequited.

English: Elisa Wain (Central Park Media, TV/OVA), Briony Glassco (Manga, Movies 1-2), Julie Ann Taylor (Bandai Visual, Movies 1-2), Michelle Ruff (Geneon, Movie 3)
 Section 2 Division 2 Team 1: The bubbly, perky red-headed labor otaku from Hokkaidō. The main character of the show, Noa is usually at the center of the action. Noa loves her labor much like a pet and named it "Alphonse", a name previously held by a pet dog and a pet cat, respectively.  She's somewhat impulsive, albeit not nearly as much as Ohta. Noa is arguably the best pilot in Division 2, although both Clancy and Kumagami have shown extreme talent as well but seldom pilot. She has a natural affinity for labors and gets 110% out of them, much to the amazement of her colleagues.  Furthermore, she can drink quite a bit more than her co-workers, and recovers from hangovers much faster, since her family runs a liquor store.

English: Dan Green (Central Park Media, TV/OVA), David Jarvis (Manga, Movies 1-2), Doug Erholtz (Bandai Visual, Movies 1-2), Richard Cansino (Geneon, Movie 3)
 Section 2 Division 2 Team 1: Son of the head of Shinohara Heavy Industries, the company that makes 90% of the labors in the world.  After a falling out with his father, Asuma joined the police force and specifically requested to be assigned to the labor units (in the OVA he claims that his father didn't think he was responsible enough to join the company and he rebelled and joined the police force but his father used his connections to get him assigned to SV2 where he would still work with them).  Smart, honest to a fault, and sometimes a bit hot-headed, Asuma is a very good officer, although he's often used by Goto as a lackey. Noa and Hiromi's commanding officer in the field, he has a soft spot for the former.  Goto recognizes Asuma has some talent in diverse fields, as can be seen in various places throughout the series. He is also a highly skilled labor pilot, certainly better than Ohta.

English: Gregory Wolfe (Central Park Media, OVA/TV), Sean Schemmel (Central Park Media, OVA 2), Michael Fitzpatrick (Manga, Movies 1-2), Jason C. Miller (Bandai Visual, Movies 1-2)
 Section 2 Division 2 Team 1: The giant from Okinawa. He is soft spoken and kind hearted.  He wanted to join his father as a fisherman but easily gets seasick.  He later joined the police force and eventually made it over to SV.2.  Yamazaki's too large to fit in a labor's cockpit, so he is designated as the carrier driver for Unit 1.  When not on duty he tends to SV.2's vegetable garden where his green fingers can be seen. He's extremely strong, as demonstrated in Movie 1 and 2 where Yamazaki mans the massive anti-labor rifle borrowed from the Narashino Parachute Labor team (apparently an M82 anti-material rifle). He shows the same strength in the TV series when he and Ohta fire the Ingram's Revolver pistol without the aid of a Labor, at the Schaft "Griffon".

English: James Wolfe (Central Park Media, TV/OVA), Martin McDougall (Manga, Movies 1-2), Sam Riegel (Bandai Visual, Movies 1-2), Richard Epcar (Geneon, Movie 3)
 Section 2 Division 2 Team 2: The gun-loving pilot of Unit 2.  With a look and attitude better suited for the Marines than a police force, Ohta is comically gung-ho and expects the rest of Section 2 to perform to his standards. He's very brash and often will charge into a situation without thinking it through. In spite of his loud, obnoxious, and often overconfident personality, Ohta's a good cop and is a stand up guy. He is extremely gun-happy, but tends to hit anything other than the target in combat. However, on the firing range where the targets are unmanned and he can remain calm, his accuracy is essentially perfect.

 (TV/OVA/Movies), Yuri Amano (Super Robot Wars)
English: Debora Rabbai (Central Park Media, TV/OVA), Tamsin Hollo (Manga, Movies 1-2), Lisa Enochs (Bandai Visual, Movies 1-2)
 NYPD, Section 2 Division 2 Team 2: A temporary member of Section 2, on assignment from the NYPD.  Sent to observe a labor unit with the purpose of helping build one for New York City. Highly capable in all duties. Her piloting skills are better than Ohta's, but was assigned to backup duty since acclimating the Labor to a temporary officer would be a poor decision. (Also, keeping Ohta in line is not a job for an idiot). Much like Nagumo, Kanuka is very by-the-book. She is usually all business and sometimes cold to the members of SV.2 with the exception of Noa. Kanuka was born in Hawaii but apparently moved to New York later on. When she travels back to New York, she stops in Hawaii to see her grandmother, whom she loves dearly.  Kanuka's piloting skills are to be feared.  Goto certainly thinks so, since he called her in to assist SV2 in the first movie.

 
 (Central Park Media, TV/OVA)
 Section 2 Division 2 Team 2: Joined Section 2 shortly after Clancy's tenure ended, she takes Clancy's place as backup to Unit 2. She trained with the Hong Kong Police Force before getting assigned to the Ministry of Foreign Affairs. She was then offered a position with Interpol but ended up choosing the Special Vehicles department to continue her career. Calm and confident, Kumagami attends to her duties as effectively as Clancy did, but has different ideas about how to go about it. She practices martial arts and can be seen tossing Ohta and the rest of the Division 2 team around in sparring matches when not in the field. Kumagami's only weakness seems to be a fear of the supernatural. She is easily spooked and prone to fainting if scared sufficiently.

English: Johnny Asch (Central Park Media, TV/OVA 1), Flavio Romeo (Central Park Media, OVA 2), Ron Lepaz (Manga, Movies 1-2), Joey Lotsko (Bandai Visual, Movies 1-2)
 Section 2 Division 2 Team 2: The lone married man of SV.2. Shinshi comes across as a meek man who can be easily pushed around. He is very devoted to his wife, and tends to snap and go off like a stick of dynamite when people make fun of him or his wife. He even scares Ohta when this occurs. He has quite a bit of programming and computer talent but is rarely seen because of his position as the carrier driver for Unit 2.

Section 2 Division 1

English voice actors: Ami Shukla (Central Park Media, TV/OVA), Sharon Holm (Manga, Movies 1-2), Megan Hollingshead  (Bandai Visual, Movies 1-2), Michelle Ruff (Geneon, Movie 3)
 Section 2 Division 1: Captain of Division 1. Was born in Setagaya Ward in Tokyo. She is a professional, competent police officer, highly regarded by everyone in the police force - basically the exact opposite of Captain Kiichi Goto. Nagumo is a by-the-book style captain (as opposed to Goto who will often use somewhat unconventional methods to meet a goal); she always keeps her mind on the job and never loses her cool. Often she talks back to her superiors when she disagrees with an order, and this is probably why she remains at the SV2 rather being promoted to another job more worthy of her skills. Despite her conventional mentality, or because of it, she is always there to lend a hand whenever Division 2 needs it. She shares an office with Goto, which means she sees a lot of Goto's layabout act – and also is able to tell that Goto is a much more skilled police officer than he looks (their professional relationship might best be described as "interesting"). It is also implied that Shinobu might have feelings for Kiichi.

 Section 2 Division 1 Team 2: One of the labor pilots for Section 1, and much like his commanding officer, he's very by the book.  A good pilot, although his coworkers in Division 2 seem to have more talent. He only appears in the TV series.

Section 2 Mechanics

English: Flavio Romeo (Central Park Media, TV/OVA), Blair Fairman (Manga, Movies 1-2), Jamieson Price (Bandai Visual, Movies 1-2)
 Section 2 Mechanics: Leader of the labor mechanics that service SV.2.  Gruff and loud, Sakaki doesn't like it when Division 2 brings back their labors in less than perfect condition.  Threatens to throw all his mechanics into the sea when they don't perform up to his expectations. Sakaki has been a mechanic for most of his life but admits he finds it difficult to keep up with the ever advancing march of technology in the world.

 aka 
 
 English: Curt Gebhart (Central Park Media, TV/OVA), Edward Glen (Manga, Movies 1-2) Peter Doyle (Bandai Visual, Movies 1-2), Ethan Murray (Geneon, Movie 3)
 Section 2 Mechanics: Second in command to Sakaki, and eventually replaces him when he retires.  A total gearhead, he loves his job--probably a little too much, as he can be very hard to relax when he gets fired up.  Shige is good friends with Asuma Shinohara.

Minor Characters

English: Matthew Harrington (Central Park Media, TV/OVA), Mac McDougall (Manga, Movies 1-2), George C. Cole (Bandai Visual, Movies 1-2)
 Tokyo Metropolitan Police:  A calm and cool man, he has quite a deal of respect for Goto which is mutual. He assists with the investigative work when Goto can't do it.

Badrinath Harchand  aka Bud

 A 15-year-old boy from India who likes computer games. He pilots the J9 Griffon labor. As a pilot, he is as talented as Noa and considers her to be his rival. He appears in the manga, novels, TV series and the second OVA series

 / 
 (Central Park Media, TV), Rik Nagel (Central Park Media, OVA 2)
 SHAFT Enterprises: Geeky, intelligent, but scheming head of one of SHAFT's experimental divisions on Labor development. He was involved in a number of incidents in Hong Kong prior to coming to Japan. (Note: "Shaft" also has the variant spelling of "Schaft", its German form.) He appears in the manga, novels, TV series and the second OVA series

 (Central Park Media, TV), Wayne Grayson (Central Park Media, OVA 2)
 Richard Wong's right-hand man. He is more serious than Wong. He only appears on the manga, novels, TV series and the second OVA series

References

Patlabor